Yulia Ryabchinskaya (21 January 1947 - 13 January 1973) was a canoeist from Ukraine and Olympic champion. She represented the USSR at the 1972 Summer Olympics in Munich, winning the gold in the K-1 500 m event.

Only four months after her Olympic victory, Ryabchinskaya was taking part in winter training at Lake Paleostomi in the Soviet republic of Georgia when she fell into the water and died from abrupt cooling. An international competition is held in her honor in Moscow every spring.

Ryabchinskaya also won a gold in the K-4 500 m event at the 1971 ICF Canoe Sprint World Championships in Belgrade.

References

1947 births
1973 deaths
Canoeing deaths
Canoeists at the 1972 Summer Olympics
Deaths by drowning
ICF Canoe Sprint World Championships medalists in kayak
Medalists at the 1972 Summer Olympics
Olympic canoeists of the Soviet Union
Olympic gold medalists for the Soviet Union
Olympic medalists in canoeing
Soviet female canoeists
Sport deaths in the Soviet Union
Ukrainian female canoeists
Sportspeople from Vinnytsia Oblast